Irmgard Schmelzer (19 June 1921 – 20 September 2002) was a German athlete. She competed in the women's long jump at the 1952 Summer Olympics.

References

1921 births
2002 deaths
Athletes (track and field) at the 1952 Summer Olympics
German female long jumpers
Olympic athletes of Germany
Place of birth missing